Dario is a masculine given name.

Dario may also refer to:

People
 Dario, list of people with the given name
 Rubén Darío (1867–1916), Nicaraguan poet
 Dario (footballer) (1944–2021), Brazilian footballer Jurandir Dário Gouveia Damasceno dos Santos
 Dario (entertainer), American singer-songwriter Dario Dicochea

Other uses
 Ciudad Darío, a Nicaraguan municipality named after Rubén Darío
 Darío (crater), a crater on the planet Mercury named after Rubén Darío
 Palazzo Dario, a palace in Venice, Italy
 Dario (fish), a genus of fishes in the family Badidae
 Daihatsu Terios, a car known as Dario in China